The British Armed Forces recognises service and personal accomplishments of individuals while a member of the Royal Navy, British Army or Royal Air Force with the awarding of various awards and decorations.

Together with rank and qualification badges, such awards are a means to outwardly display the highlights of a serviceperson's career.

Order of wear 
All services use a common order of wear, the following general rules apply:  
 The Victoria Cross and the George Cross
 United Kingdom Orders
 United Kingdom Decorations
 Order of St John (all classes)
 United Kingdom Medals for Gallantry and for Distinguished Service
 United Kingdom Campaign and Operational Service Medals (including authorised United Nations medals and medals of other recognised international organisations). Worn in order of date of award
 United Kingdom Polar Medals
 United Kingdom Police Medals for Valuable Service
 United Kingdom Jubilee, Coronation and Durbar Medals
 Long Service and Efficiency Awards
 Commonwealth Orders, Decorations and Medals instituted by the Sovereign. Worn in order of date of award.
 Commonwealth Orders, Decorations and Medals instituted since 1949 otherwise than by the Sovereign (including those of the States of Malaysia and the State of Brunei). Worn in order of date of award.
 Foreign Orders. If approved for wear, worn in order of date of award.
 Foreign Decorations. If approved for wear, worn in order of date of award.
 Foreign Medals. If approved for wear, worn in order of date of award.
Note: Jubilee, Coronation and Durbar medals were worn before campaign medals until November 1918, after which the order of wear was changed, with them now worn after campaign medals and before long service awards.

British military medals and ribbons

Military orders and decorations

Note [1] Eligibility period start dates reflect respective establishment dates, except where available evidence indicates otherwise.

Military campaign medals

Notes:

Coronation, Jubilee and Durbar medals

Efficiency and long service decorations and medals

National independence medals

Foreign and international

International campaign medals
Worn with other United Kingdom campaign medals in order of date of issue (except where noted otherwise).

Commonwealth orders
Worn after all United Kingdom awards (including international awards treated as United Kingdom awards). Honorary awards are worn before substantive awards.

Commonwealth decorations
Worn after all Commonwealth orders.

Commonwealth campaign and commemorative medals
Worn after all Commonwealth decorations.

Foreign orders
Worn after all Commonwealth awards.

Foreign decorations
Worn after all foreign orders.

Foreign campaign and commemorative medals
Worn after all foreign decorations.

Decorations and medals authorised for acceptance but not for official wear
Official permission has been granted for this medal to be accepted, but it is not authorised for wear.

Campaign medals authorised for acceptance but not for official wear
Official permission has been granted for these medals to be accepted, but they are not authorised for wear.

Campaign medals not authorised for acceptance or official wear
Official permission has been refused for these medals to be accepted and they are not authorised for wear.

Devices

See also
 Orders, decorations, and medals of the United Kingdom
 British campaign medals
 List of military decorations
 State decoration

References

Footnotes

Bibliography

External links
 UK Ministry of Defence Medals Office
 UK Ministry of Defence Medals Office – British Armed Forces Medals: Decorations, campaign medals and other awards awarded 'On Her Majesty's Service'
 The UK Honours System
 Cabinet Office Ceremonial Secretariat website
 London Gazette website
 
 Medals of the World – United Kingdom Medals
 War Medals and Their History Detailed historical information on British military and naval awards from the Spanish Armada to World War I

 
Orders, decorations, and medals of the United Kingdom
United Kingdom military-related lists